The 2019 British GT Championship was the 27th British GT Championship, a sports car championship promoted by the Stéphane Ratel Organisation (SRO). The season began on 20 April at Oulton Park and finished on 15 September at Donington Park, after ten rounds held over seven meetings.

Calendar
The calendar for the 2019 season was announced on 30 July 2018. Except for the Belgian round at Spa, all races were held in the United Kingdom.

Calendar Changes
The round at Rockingham Motor Speedway was dropped and replaced with a second round at Donington Park.

Entry list

GT3

GT4

Race Results
Bold indicates overall winner for each car class (GT3 and GT4).

GT3

GT4

Championship Standings
Points are awarded as follows:

Drivers' Championships

Overall

Pro-Am Cup

Silver Cup

Am Cup

Blancpain Trophy

1 – Driver scored 5 points for being fastest in the Am Driver Qualifying Session.

Teams' Championship
Only the two best results of a team per race count towards the Teams' Championship.

References

External links
 

British GT Championship seasons
GT Championship